The Moon Is Down is a 1943 American war film starring Cedric Hardwicke and Henry Travers and directed by Irving Pichel. It is based on the 1942 novel of the same name by John Steinbeck. During World War II, German soldiers occupy a small Norwegian town.

Cast
 Sir Cedric Hardwicke as Col. Lanser
 Henry Travers as Mayor Orden
 Lee J. Cobb as Dr. Albert Winter
 Dorris Bowdon as Molly Morden
 Margaret Wycherly as Sarah Orden
 Peter van Eyck as Lt. Tonder
 William Post, Jr. as Alex Morden
 Henry Rowland as Capt. Loft
 E. J. Ballantine as George Corell
 Hans Schumm as Capt. Bentick
 Frederic Brunn as German Soldier (as Frederick Brunn)
 Ernst Deutsch as Maj. Hunter (as Ernest Dorian)
 Ludwig Donath as Hitler's Voice (as Louis Donath) 
 John Banner as Lt. Prackle (uncredited)
 Jeff Corey as Albert (uncredited)
 Ludwig Hardt as Elderly Man (uncredited)

Production
The set of How Green Was My Valley was reused for this film.

Reception
Bosley Crowther, the film reviewer for The New York Times, gave The Moon Is Down a mixed verdict. He lauded screenwriter Nunnally Johnson for creating a "clear and incisive screen version" of the book, resulting in "a picture which is the finest on captured Norway yet and a powerful expression of faith in the enduring qualities of a people whose hearts are strong." He also praised "Irving Pichel's superlative direction and a generally excellent cast". However, Crowther also observed that "the intellectual nature of this picture—its very clear and dispassionate reasoning—drain it of much of the emotion that one expects in such a story at this time."

References

External links

American World War II propaganda films
American black-and-white films
Films based on American novels
Films directed by Irving Pichel
Films set in Norway
20th Century Fox films
Films based on works by John Steinbeck
1943 war films
Films about Norwegian resistance movement
World War II films made in wartime
1940s English-language films